Fabián Velasco (20 January 1902 – 3 February 1953) was a Spanish athlete. He competed in the men's individual cross country event at the 1924 Summer Olympics.

References

External links
 

1902 births
1953 deaths
Athletes (track and field) at the 1924 Summer Olympics
Spanish male long-distance runners
Olympic athletes of Spain
People from Castro Urdiales
Olympic cross country runners